Sushant or Susant Mani is an Indian film director, working in the Odia film industry. He also works as an editor, writer and choreographer.

Career
He started his career as an editor and director of album videos for sarthak music. After some albums he started to work in films as an editor and choreographer. He also has written the stories and screenplays of some of his films. He made his debut as director with the film Aa Janhare Lekhiba Naa. His recent work has shown an ambition to move into Ollywood filmmaking.

Filmography 

As Director:
 2 Chocolate (2019)
 This Is ମାୟାରେ ବାୟା (2019)
 Nimki-nimpur ru nabin niwas (2019) 
 Laila O Laila (2017) - remake of the Marathi movie Sairat
 Sapanara Pathe Pathe (2017)
 Tu Kahibu Na Mu (2016)
 Hello: In Love (2015)
 Kehi Nuhen Kahara (2015) 
 Pagala Karichu Tu (2014) 
 Lekhu Lekhu Lekhi Deli (2014)
 Golapi Golapi (2014)
 Akhire Akhire (2014) - remake of the Telugu movie Ishq
 Mu Eka Tumara (2013) - remake of the Kannada movie Chandra Chakori
 Luchakali (2012) - based on Sleeping with the Enemy
 Chocolate (2011) - remake of the Telugu movie Oy!
 Most Wanted (2011)
 Aama Bhitare Kichhi Achhi (2010)
 Abhimanyu (2009) - remake of the Tamil movie Chithiram Pesuthadi
 Aa Janhare Lekhiba Naa (2009)

Honours and awards 
 2005- Odisha State Film Award for Best Editor - Shaashu Ghara Chaalijibi 
 2007- Odisha State Film Award for Best Editor - Mu Tate Love Karuchi 
 2015- Odisha State Film Award for Best Screenplay - Kehi Nuhe Kahara

References

External links

Year of birth missing (living people)
Living people
Odia film directors
Film directors from Odisha
21st-century Indian film directors